Qoltuq Rural District is in the Central District of Zanjan County, Zanjan province, Iran. At the National Census of 2006, its population was 5,284 in 1,259 households. There were 4,632 inhabitants in 1,376 households at the following census of 2011. At the most recent census of 2016, the population of the rural district was 3,530 in 1,269 households. The largest of its 11 villages was Qoltuq, with 986 people.

References 

Zanjan County

Rural Districts of Zanjan Province

Populated places in Zanjan Province

Populated places in Zanjan County